William Neil Gallagher is an American Christian radio host. He stole $23 million from over 190 people in a Ponzi scheme over the course of a decade. His victims ages ranged from 62 to 91. He was sentenced to life in prison for the crime and made to pay $10 million in restitution.

References 

American radio hosts
Year of birth missing (living people)
Living people